The La Vérendrye Trail is a series of highways in the Canadian province of Manitoba commemorating the oldest waterway fur-trading route in the province. It is named after Pierre Gaultier de Varennes, sieur de La Vérendrye, an explorer and fur-trader who is often credited as being the first European to visit what is now southern Manitoba.

Route description
The La Vérendrye Trail generally follows the Red and Winnipeg River systems used by early fur-traders to travel through eastern Manitoba. The vehicular route begins at Provincial Trunk Highway (PTH) 101 (Winnipeg's Perimeter Highway) and comprises the following roads:
Provincial Road 204 – PTH 101 (Perimeter Highway) to Provincial Road 212
Provincial Road 212 – Provincial Road 204 to Provincial Road 508
Provincial Road 508 – entire route
PTH 59 – Provincial Road 508 to PTH 11
PTH 11 – PTH 59 to Provincial Road 307
Provincial Road 307 – entire route
PTH 44 – Provincial Road 307 to PTH 1 (Trans-Canada Highway)

Communities along the trail include Lockport, East Selkirk, Powerview-Pine Falls, St. Georges, Lac du Bonnet, and Seven Sisters Falls. The trail also passes through three First Nations territories. The easternmost part of the trail lies within Whiteshell Provincial Park.

Other uses
The La Vérendrye Trail is also the name of a  hiking trail located within Whiteshell Provincial Park.

A monument in the Municipality of Pembina commemorates Sieur de La Vérendrye's further travels through south-central Manitoba.

Major intersections

References

External links
Official Highyway Map of Manitoba - Eastern region

Historic trails and roads in Manitoba